KJLR may refer to:

 KJLR-LP, a low-power radio station (100.5 FM) licensed to serve Reno, Nevada, United States
 KJLR-LP (defunct), a defunct low-power television station (channel 28) formerly licensed to serve Little Rock, etc., Arkansas, United States